Alaeddine Yahia (born 26 September 1981) is a Tunisian former professional footballer who played as a centre-back.

Yahia has previously played for Stade Tunisien, Guingamp and had a brief spell at Southampton, although he did not play a first team game for the club.

Yahia was part of the Tunisian 2004 Olympic football team, who exited in the first round, finishing third in group C, behind group and gold medal winners Argentina and group runners-up Australia. He was part of the squad that won the 2004 African Cup of Nations.

On 24 February 2007, Yahia played his first Ligue 1 match for Sedan against Rennes.

Honours
Tunisia
 Africa Cup of Nations: 2004

References

External links

 
 
 
 

Living people
1981 births
Sportspeople from Colombes
Footballers from Hauts-de-Seine
Tunisian footballers
French footballers
Association football central defenders
Tunisia international footballers
AS Saint-Étienne players
Louhans-Cuiseaux FC players
CS Sedan Ardennes players
En Avant Guingamp players
OGC Nice players
RC Lens players
Stade Malherbe Caen players
AS Nancy Lorraine players
Southampton F.C. players
Ligue 1 players
Ligue 2 players
Championnat National players
2004 African Cup of Nations players
2006 Africa Cup of Nations players
2006 FIFA World Cup players
Footballers at the 2004 Summer Olympics
French sportspeople of Tunisian descent
Olympic footballers of Tunisia
Mediterranean Games gold medalists for Tunisia
Mediterranean Games medalists in football
Competitors at the 2001 Mediterranean Games
Tunisian expatriate footballers
Tunisian expatriate sportspeople in England
Expatriate footballers in England